Operation Substance was a British naval operation in July 1941 during the Second World War to escort convoy GM 1, the first of the series from Gibraltar to Malta. The convoy defended by Force H was attacked by Italian submarines, aircraft, and Motoscafo armato silurante (MAS boats).

The convoy
The convoy of six cargo ships carried one light and one heavy anti-aircraft regiment with 30 field guns to strengthen the island against possible airborne assault. Medical personnel expected to be needed in the forthcoming siege were also embarked.

Prelude
The Royal Navy observed decreasing intensity of Regia Aeronautica attacks as the torpedo inventory at Sardinian airfields was nearly exhausted. The ships of convoy GM 1 sailed from the British Isles on 13 July 1941 as part of convoy WS (Winston Specials) 9C, and arrived at Gibraltar on 20 July. Ships of the Mediterranean Fleet operating from Alexandria began making heavy radio traffic in the hope of diverting attention to possible preparations for a major operation in the eastern Mediterranean. Eight Allied submarines were deployed off Italian naval bases; but the Italian fleet assumed the convoy was merely Ark Royal flying-off replacement aircraft to Malta, and chose to remain in port. Leinster ran aground while leaving Gibraltar on 21 July and had to return to port.

Battle of 23 July

The convoy came under low level attack by nine Savoia-Marchetti SM.79 torpedo bombers coordinated with five CANT Z.1007 high level bombers. Four Fulmars met the torpedo planes head-on and shot one down before another SM.79 launched a torpedo which hit Manchester before also being shot down. Ark Royal launched seven more Fulmars which were unable to engage the high level bombers before they released bombs which failed to hit the convoyed ships. Three Fulmars were shot down. A later attack by two SM.79s sank  killing 35 of her crew. Another bombing attack near-missed  causing damage requiring the destroyer to be towed back to Gibraltar. Bristol Beaufighters from Malta assisted Ark Royal Fulmars defending the convoy from these attacks.

 detected MAS boats 532 and 533 approaching the convoy after dark, but was unable to prevent them from torpedoing SS Sydney Star at around 03:00 on 24 July. The merchant ship, carrying 484 army officers and men in addition to its normal crew, came to a dead stop as it took on water. Fearing that the ship's pumps couldn't cope with the damage, the captain requested evacuation of the troops. The Nestor came alongside and took on board approximately 500 men via gangplank and Jacob's ladder, leaving the captain and a skeleton crew on the Sydney Star. The captain later estimated that his ship had taken on 7,000 tons of water. Nestor successfully towed the damaged 11,000-ton cargo ship to Malta, arriving at the Grand Harbour shortly after 08:00.

Aftermath
Seven empty ships sailed from Malta as convoy MG 1 on 23 July to be convoyed back to Gibraltar by Force H. One was damaged by an aircraft torpedo on the voyage west. Ark Royal lost a total of six Fulmars defending convoy MG 1 and the Malta bound ships from Gibraltar and at least 12 Axis aircraft, in total, were destroyed by FAA fighters and the AA guns of the Royal Navy.

The six cargo ships of convoy GM 1 arrived in Malta on 24 July where they were observed by a CANT Z.506 reconnaissance seaplane escorted by 42 Macchi C.200 fighters. Malta launched 22 Hawker Hurricane fighters which shot down three of the escort without loss. An audacious attack on Grand Harbour by other MAS boats and manned torpedoes on the night of 25–26 July was thwarted by Ultra intelligence and ended in disaster for the Italians.

See also
 Battle of the Mediterranean
 Malta Convoys

Notes

References

External links
 MV Leinster 1937

Battle of the Mediterranean
Malta Convoys
Naval battles and operations of World War II involving the United Kingdom
July 1941 events